Stanwick is a village and civil parish in North Northamptonshire, England.

Toponymy
The village's name origin is unclear. The first part of the village's name is clearly from Old English "stan", meaning "stone". The second part appears to be from Old English "wīc", meaning "village" (see ), but it may actually be from "wicga" meaning "insect/beetle" (as in "earwig"), likely used here in the feeling of something that wriggles or "tremors" (as with the name of Wigmore).

Over time, the pronunciation and spelling of the name has changed slightly.  
 In the 10th century, it was referred to as "Stan Wigga".  
 1086 in the Domesday Book it is referred to as "Stanwige" and "Stanwica". 
 1137 in the Anglo-Saxon Chronicle it is referred to as "Stanwigga".
 1668 on the funeral monument to John Atkins, Lord of the Manor, it is referred to as "Stanwigge".

History

There has been a settlement at Stanwick since Roman times at the latest. A Roman villa was excavated in 1984–1992 and several mosaics were found prior to the construction of a bypass and mass excavation of gravel.  In 2013, one of the mosaics was returned after study and is now on display in the Visitor Centre at Stanwick Lakes.

In 1086 the manor of Stanwick was held by Peterborough Abbey but by 1284 there appear to have been two manors.

In 2007, Stanwick, Hargrave, Raunds and Ringstead were legally united as "The 4 Spires Benefice", with each village retaining its own church.

On 29 June 2017 the Stanwick electorate voted on whether to adopt a local Neighbourhood Plan.  With an above average turnout of 51.1%, 97.4% of those who voted, voted YES to adopt the plan.  On 17 July 2017, East Northamptonshire Council made (adopted) the Stanwick Neighbourhood Plan; it is now a legal planning document that must be considered by the Local Planning Authority when appropriate planning applications are decided.

Heritage assets

The following buildings and structures are listed by Historic England as of special architectural or historic interest.

Raunds bowl barrow (Scheduled) Prehistoric 
Church of St Laurence (Grade I) 13th century 
Section of wall and attached churchyard cross socket (Grade II) 14th century 
39 High Street (Grade II) 17th century 
Dovecote Close (Grade II) 17th century 
Manor House (Grade II) 17th century 
Stanwick Hall (Grade II*) 18th century 
Old Rectory (Grade II*) 18th century 
Grange Farmhouse (Grade II) 18th century 
War Memorial (Grade II) 20th century 

Whilst the following Heritage Assets are not listed with Historic England, they are of historical importance to the village.

Georgian post box 
Duke of Wellington public house (rebuilt 1817) 
Various stone walls through the village (circa 1838)
Old School Rooms (built 1839) 
Queen Victoria's Diamond Jubilee marker (1897) 
Red telephone box 
Queen Elizabeth II's Diamond Jubilee marker (2012) 
World War I Commemorative Plaque (2014) 

Between 1960 and 1990 the village lost three important buildings.

Stanwick House was demolished following a fire 
Hill House was demolished after it deteriorated structurally 
Stanwick Water Mill was demolished as it was surplus to requirements and gravel extraction was about to start in the area

Geography

Nearby settlements include Raunds, Hargrave, Chelveston, Ringstead, Higham Ferrers, Rushden, Thrapston, Irthlingborough and Wellingborough. Stanwick is approximately 15 miles north-east of Northampton and is the largest village in the East Northamptonshire district.

Demography

 In 1086 there were 17 households (Domesday)
In 1801 there were 332 persons
 In 1811 there were 397 persons
 In 1821 there were 424 persons
 In 1831 there were 503 persons
 In 1841 there were 577 persons living in 113 households
 In 1851 there were 609 persons living in 134 households
 In 1870 there were 669 persons living in 147 households
 In 1901 there were 901 persons living in 214 households
 In 1911 there were 922 persons living in 212 households
 In 1981 there were 1,343 persons living in 530 households
 In 1991 there were 1,481 persons living in 575 households
 In 2001 there were 1,924 persons living in 733 households
 In 2011 there were 1,942 persons living in 754 households
 In 2021 there were 1,891 persons living in 754 households

Stanwick was the largest village population in the district of East Northamptonshire but it is not the largest village population in North Northamptonshire. The village was a ward of Raunds Town Council until April 2000, when Stanwick Parish Council was established. It had originally been an independent parish, but was transferred from Thrapston Rural District to Raunds urban district in 1935.

Education

Stanwick Primary School became an Academy in 2016. It is a mixed school for children aged from 4 to 11 years old and was awarded a Grade 2 (Good) rating by OfSTED in 2019. There is the Acorn Day Nursery for children aged from 4 months to 4 years old, that was rated Outstanding by OfSTED in 2022.  There is also a non-profit Stanwick Pre-school Playgroup for children aged from 2 to 5 years old. that was rated Good by OfSTED in 2022.

Amenities and events

The Duke of Wellington public house was formerly called the Cock Inn and was renamed The Duke of Wellington Inn, between 1817 and 1820 in honour of the Duke of Wellington following the Battle of Waterloo on 18 June 1815.

An annual fundraising event for St Laurence Church is organised by the Friends of Stanwick Church (FoSC) and starts with the Teddy Bear Parachute Jump where children's brave Teddy bears wearing parachutes are dropped from the top of the church. A volunteer rescue team is on hand, should any bear get into difficulties!

The Stanwick Races Event is held annually on Easter Monday and consists of a 10 km Road Race and a 2 km Fun Run. It is organised by volunteers from the village and the surrounding area. It includes participants from a number of countries in addition to semi-professionals and amateurs from the local area.

Services include Stanwick Club (a former Working Men's Club), the Duke of Wellington public house and a village shop incorporating the post office.

In 2006 Stanwick Lakes opened. It is a country park on the outskirts of the village, managed by the Rockingham Forest Trust on behalf of East Northamptonshire District Council. It comprises 750 acres (304 hectares) of former gravel pits and is part of the larger River Nene Regional Park. Located in close proximity to the country park is a selection of fishing lakes.

In 2009 the Parish Council purchased 10 acres (4 hectares) of land, now called the "Parish Fields", at the eastern end of the village that, when fully developed, will include a pocket park, wildflower meadow, recreation area and allotments.

In 2011 a new village hall was built in the village near to the church, replacing the old "Shant" and former British Legion Hall.

In 2012 the post office moved across the High Street to the site of the Old School (established by a Trust Deed in 1839). In the refurbished building there is also an enlarged shop, a cafe and a bistro.

References

External links

 Stanwick War Memorial ("Stanwick's Everlasting Loss")
 Stanwick Parish Council
 Stanwick Photos

Villages in Northamptonshire
Civil parishes in Northamptonshire
North Northamptonshire